Vithal Dayaji is a Hindu temple located in Sulewadi, a village near Piliv, in the Indian state of Maharashtra.  This temple is devoted to a Kuladevata, a family deity that is either a god or a goddess.  This temple is on the land of Janardhan Sule.  The fairy day event is celebrated 15 days after Diwali, the "festival of lights", circa in October or November each year.  The exact date is decided by the Hindu Lunisolar calendar.

References

Hindu temples in Maharashtra
Tourist attractions in Solapur district